The Rural Municipality of Russell is a former rural municipality (RM) in the Canadian province of Manitoba. It was originally incorporated as a rural municipality on August 15, 1881. It ceased on January 1, 2015 as a result of its provincially mandated amalgamation with the Town of Russell and the Village of Binscarth to form the Municipality of Russell – Binscarth.

The former RM is located in the Parkland Region of the province adjacent to the Gambler 63 First Nations Indian reserve to the south. It had a population of 661 according to the Canada 2006 Census.

Communities 
Harrowby
Johnson
Millwood

References

External links 
 
 Manitoba Municipalities: Rural Municipality of Russell
 Map of Russell R.M. at Statcan

Russell
Populated places disestablished in 2015
2015 disestablishments in Manitoba